Wasserburg  may refer to:

 Water castle, a castle surrounded by a body of water

Places
 Krausnick-Groß Wasserburg, a municipality in Brandenburg, Germany
 Wasserburg am Inn, a town in Upper Bavaria, Germany
 TSV 1880 Wasserburg, a multi-sport club
 Wasserburg am Inn (district), a former district 
 Wasserburg am Bodensee, a municipality in Bavaria, Germany
 Wasserburg, a late Bronze Age settlement near Bad Buchau, Germany
 Führer Headquarters Wasserburg, a Nazi German military headquarters near Pskov in the Soviet Union
 Wasserbourg (German: Wasserburg), a commune in Grand Est, France

Other uses
 Gerald J. Wasserburg (1927–2016), American geologist
 Philipp Wasserburg (1827-1897), German writer and member of the parliament
 4765 Wasserburg, an asteroid

See also